Józef Kurzawa (1910–1940) was a Polish and Roman Catholic priest. He was executed by firing squad. He is one of the 108 Martyrs of World War II who were beatified by Pope John Paul II in 1999.

See also 
The Holocaust in Poland
World War II casualties of Poland

References

1910 births
1940 deaths
People from Kalisz
People from Włocławek
People executed by Nazi Germany by firing squad
108 Blessed Polish Martyrs